Deltora Quest  may refer to:

 Deltora Quest (series), collectively, three series of children's fantasy books by Emily Rodda, as well as the companion books to the series
 Deltora Quest (Deltora Quest 1), the original eight-book series
 Deltora Shadowlands (Deltora Quest 2), the second series (three books)
 Dragons of Deltora (Deltora Quest 3), the third and final series (four books)
 Deltora Quest (anime), Japanese anime series based on Rodda's book series